Atilla Koç (born March 1, 1946) is a Turkish politician of the Justice and Development Party. He was the Minister of Culture and Tourism in the first cabinet of Recep Tayyip Erdogan.

After graduating from Ankara University, he worked in the Ministry of Interior and Konya Police Department. He served as district governor in Ulubey, Nusaybin and Bayındır, then as provincial governor of Siirt and Giresun.

He is married and has three children.

References

External links 

1946 births
Living people
Governors (Turkey)
Deputies of Aydın
Justice and Development Party (Turkey) politicians
Ankara University Faculty of Political Sciences alumni
Ministers of Culture of Turkey
Members of the 23rd Parliament of Turkey
Members of the 22nd Parliament of Turkey
Ministers of Culture and Tourism of Turkey